Vezhayka is the name of several rural localities in Russia:
Vezhayka, Kochyovsky District, Perm Krai, a village in Kochyovsky District, Perm Krai
Vezhayka, Kudymkarsky District, Perm Krai, a village in Kudymkarsky District, Perm Krai